Raúl Alejandro Apold (1898-1980) was the propaganda chief for Juan Domingo Perón.

As a close associate of Eva Perón, Apold was an official with the General Confederation of Labor.

Bibliography

References

External links
 Time magazine
 Evita Historical Research Society
 Google Books

1898 births
1980 deaths
People from Buenos Aires
Argentine people of German descent
Members of the General Confederation of Labour (Argentina)
Peronism
Burials at La Chacarita Cemetery
Grand Crosses with Star and Sash of the Order of Merit of the Federal Republic of Germany